The Central District of Saman County is in Chaharmahal and Bakhtiari province, Iran. At the most recent National Census in 2016, the district had 24,449 inhabitants living in 7,792 households. The district's constituent parts were in Shahrekord County before the establishment of Saman County.

References 

Saman County

Districts of Chaharmahal and Bakhtiari Province

Populated places in Chaharmahal and Bakhtiari Province

Populated places in Saman County

fa:بخش مرکزی شهرستان سامان